The Dublin–Tipperary rivalry is a hurling rivalry between Irish county teams Dublin and Tipperary.
Both teams play provincial hurling, Tipperary in the Munster Senior Hurling Championship and Dublin in the Leinster Senior Hurling Championship. All of their championship meetings have been in the All-Ireland Senior Hurling Championship, the first being in 1896.

The first meeting between the sides in 46 years occurred in 2007 All-Ireland Qualifiers at Parnell Park where Tipperary won by 1-20 to 1-11.
Their next meeting was in the 2011 All-Ireland Semi-final at Croke Park where Tipperary won by 1-19 to 0-18.

Championship meetings

References

External links
Dublin v Tipperary all-time results

Tipperary
Tipperary county hurling team rivalries